A linear differential operator L is called quasi-exactly-solvable (QES) if it has a finite-dimensional invariant subspace of functions  such that  where n is a dimension of . There are two important cases:
  is the space of multivariate polynomials of degree not higher than some integer number; and
  is a subspace of a Hilbert space. Sometimes, the functional space  is isomorphic to the finite-dimensional representation space of a Lie algebra g of first-order differential operators. In this case, the operator L is called a g-Lie-algebraic Quasi-Exactly-Solvable operator. Usually, one can indicate basis where L has block-triangular form. If the operator L is of the second order and has the form of the Schrödinger operator, it is called a Quasi-Exactly-Solvable Schrödinger operator.

The most studied cases are one-dimensional -Lie-algebraic quasi-exactly-solvable (Schrödinger) operators. The best known example is the sextic QES anharmonic oscillator with the Hamiltonian

where (n+1) eigenstates of positive (negative) parity can be found algebraically. Their eigenfunctions are of the form

where  is a polynomial of degree n and (energies) eigenvalues are roots of an algebraic equation of degree (n+1). In general, twelve families of one-dimensional QES problems are known, two of them characterized by elliptic potentials.

References

External links

Differential operators
Mathematical analysis
Multivariable calculus